Trans World Connection was an affiliated brand name with Trans World Airlines (TWA).  Other regional and commuter airlines operated code sharing service for TWA as Trans World Express.

The brand ended in December 2001, after American Airlines acquired the assets of TWA.

The brand name was used for American Eagle Airlines service from Los Angeles International Airport in Los Angeles, California and John F. Kennedy International Airport in New York City, New York.

Ending in 2000, Gulfstream International Airlines operated flights under the Trans World Connection name.

Destinations

Destinations at closure
All were operated by AmericanConnection.
Canada
 Quebec
 Montreal (Dorval International Airport)
United States
 California
 Bakersfield (Meadows Field Airport)
 Fresno (Fresno Yosemite International Airport)
 Los Angeles (Los Angeles International Airport) Hub
 Monterey (Monterey Peninsula Airport)
 Palm Springs (Palm Springs International Airport)
 San Diego (San Diego International Airport)
 San Luis Obispo (San Luis Obispo County Regional Airport)
 Santa Barbara (Santa Barbara Airport)
 Connecticut
 Hartford (Bradley International Airport)
 Maryland
 Baltimore (Baltimore-Washington International Airport)
 Massachusetts
 Boston (Logan International Airport)
 Worcester (Worcester Regional Airport)
 New York
 Albany (Albany International Airport)
 Buffalo (Buffalo Niagara International Airport)
 New York City (John F. Kennedy International Airport Hub
 Rochester (Greater Rochester International Airport)
 Syracuse (Syracuse Hancock International Airport)
 North Carolina
 Raleigh-Durham (Raleigh-Durham International Airport)
 Pennsylvania
 Pittsburgh (Pittsburgh International Airport)
 Rhode Island
 Providence (T. F. Green Airport)
 Virginia
 Washington, D.C. area (Ronald Reagan National Airport)

Destinations before closure
All routes below were operated by Gulfstream.
United States territories
 Puerto Rico
 San Juan (Luis Muñoz Marín International Airport) (Hub)
 U.S. Virgin Islands
 St. Thomas (Cyril E. King Airport)
 Saint Croix (Henry E. Rohlsen International Airport)
Netherlands Antilles
 Saint Martin (Princess Juliana International Airport)
Saint Kitts and Nevis
 Saint Kitts (Robert L. Bradshaw International Airport)
British Virgin Islands
 Tortola (Terrance B. Lettsome International Airport)
 Virgin Gorda (Virgin Gorda Airport)

See also 
 Trans World Express
 List of defunct airlines of the United States

References

Defunct airlines of the United States
Defunct regional airline brands
Trans World Airlines